Qasemabad (also Romanized as Qāsemābād) is a village in Kavir Rural District, Kavirat District, Aran va Bidgol County, Isfahan Province, Iran. At the 2006 census, its population was 554, in 141 families.

References 

Populated places in Aran va Bidgol County